Susat may refer to:

 SUSAT, telescopic sight
 Susat (Rostov Oblast), Russia
 Susart, Isfahan Province, Iran, sometimes romanised as Sūsāt
 Susat, archaic name of several cities called Soest (disambiguation)